The 2011 Bulgarian Cup Final was the 71st final of the Bulgarian Cup. The match took place on 25 May 2011 at Vasil Levski National Stadium in Sofia. The match was contested by CSKA Sofia, who beat Litex Lovech 2–1 in their semi-final, and Slavia Sofia who beat Pirin Blagoevgrad 7–6 on penalties after a 1–1 draw after extra time. CSKA won the final 1–0, claiming their twenty Bulgarian Cup triumph, with forward Spas Delev scoring the only goal of the game in the 39th minute.

Background
Up to the 2011 final, CSKA Sofia had reached the Bulgarian Cup Final 32 times, winning nineteen of them, while Slavia Sofia had won seven of their ten finals.

Route to the final

Pre-match

Match ball
The match ball for the 2011 Bulgarian Cup Final was the Puma PowerCat 1.10. The ball has an irregular 20-panel configuration. The ball will be used only for the final.

Officials
Petrich-based referee Ivaylo Stoyanov was named as the referee for the 2011 Bulgarian Cup Final on 23 May 2011. His assistants for the 2011 final were Nikolay Angelov and Ventsislav Gavrilov, with Tasko Taskov as the fourth official.

Match

Summary
A goal six minutes before the interval from right winger Spas Delev gave Milen Radukanov’s team victory. The goal capped off a remarkable achievement from Delev, who found the net in every round of the competition. Delev finished smartly for his goal in the 39th minute, placing home from six yards. Slavia striker Nikolay Bozhov should have equalised two minutes later, only to be denied by a good save from CSKA goalkeeper Ivan Karadzhov.

There were several chances in the last 20 minutes and CSKA should have gone 2-0 up when Gregory Nelson was played through, but he missed his chance. It nearly proved costly as Karadzhov spilled a shot soon after, but Radoslav Dimitrov missed in the goalmouth scramble as CSKA lifted the cup for the first time since they beat Cherno More Varna 3-1 in the 2006 final. Slavia ended the game with 10 men after Brazilian defender Josias Basso was sent off in the closing stages.

Details

See also
2010–11 A Group

References 

Bulgarian Cup finals
Cup Final
PFC CSKA Sofia matches
PFC Slavia Sofia matches